Eberhard Eimler (born 30 November 1930, died December 2022) was a retired German Air Force General.  He was Inspector of the Air Force, the senior air force appointment, from 1983 to 1987 and Deputy Supreme Allied Commander Europe from 1987 to 1990.

Eimler was the son of a pioneer captain. He joined the air force in May 1956. From 1966 till 1970 he worked in the Federal Ministry of Defence in Bonn.

In October 1980 Eimler was promoted to Generalleutnant and appointed Deputy Commander of the Allied Air Forces Central Europe (AAFCE) under the U.S. General Charles A. Gabriel. He was appointed to four star general as Deputy Supreme Allied Commander Europe, being only the 24th person holding that rank in the German Armed Forces after World War II.

References
German Air Force - General Eberhard Eimler (German)

 

|-
 

1930 births
Bundeswehr generals
Living people
Military personnel from Ulm
German Air Force pilots
People from the Free People's State of Württemberg
NATO military personnel
Generals of the German Air Force
Knights Commander of the Order of Merit of the Federal Republic of Germany